Pittman may refer to:

People
Pittman (surname)

Places
Pittman, Florida, United States
Pittman Center, Tennessee, United States

Other uses
The Pittman Act, a United States federal law regarding currency
The Pittman-Robertson Act, a United States federal law regarding firearms and conservation
The Autobiography of Miss Jane Pittman, a 1971 novel by Ernest J. Gaines

See also
Pitman (disambiguation)